Dudley Sutton (6 April 1933 – 15 September 2018) was an English actor. Active in radio, stage, film and television, he was arguably best known for his role of Tinker Dill in the BBC Television drama series Lovejoy.

Early life 
Sutton was born in Kingston upon Thames, and educated at a boys' boarding school at Lifton Park, Devon. He served in the Royal Air Force as a mechanic before enrolling in the Royal Academy of Dramatic Art, from which he was later expelled for responding to rock-and-roll.

Career 
After early stage work with Joan Littlewood's Theatre Workshop, Sutton became known for his unusual roles in two films directed by Sidney J. Furie. He played a frustrated teenager accused with his friends of murder in The Boys (1962) and a gay biker in The Leather Boys (1964), both parts showing his potential for offbeat screen personae. At a reunion of the three surviving stars of the earlier film in London on 17 September 2017, Sutton related that he felt himself privileged that these movies had dealt with two matters close to his heart: the iniquity of the death penalty, and gay rights. 

On stage, he played the title role in the original production of Joe Orton's Entertaining Mr Sloane (1964), and transferred with it to Broadway the following year. From 25 May 1966, he appeared in Tango, a play by Slawomir Mrozek at the Aldwych Theatre alongside Patience Collier, Peter Jeffrey, Mike Pratt, and Ursula Mohan under director Trevor Nunn.

Sutton appeared in many films during his career, including Rotten to the Core (1965), Crossplot (1969), The Devils (1971), Madame Sin (1972), The Pink Panther Strikes Again (1976), Fellini's Casanova (1976), Edward II (1991), and The Football Factory (2004).

Among his many television appearances were his roles as Tinker Dill in Lovejoy (1986 and 1991–94) – whose friendship with Lovejoy, the title character, and expertise in the antique trade was the backbone of the show – as Mr Carter in the Beiderbecke Trilogy and as Oleg Kirov in Smiley's People (1982). He also featured as Max Deller, a career criminal involved in a heist of gold bullion in The Sweeney episode "Golden Boy" and in a Christmas special episode of Porridge (1976) as the somewhat-unstable, prison trustee-turned-hostage-taker Reg Urwin, with Ronnie Barker and Richard Beckinsale.

In 1999, he appeared in the BBC Radio play Cosmos the Mystic Dog. In 2004, he made an appearance in the soap opera EastEnders for sixteen episodes, playing Wilfred Atkins, a conman.

In 2003, Sutton found inspiration from the internet "where apparently people say that every time you masturbate God kills a kitten." From that statement, he developed a comic piece about "a young man's emotions and feelings, from the moment he's a baby tugging at his cock onwards." In August 2003, he performed the one-man Killing Kittens show at Edinburgh's Underbelly.

Sutton followed up Killing Kittens with a second autobiographical show Pandora's Lunchbox in 2006. Following a performance as William Blake in Peter Ackroyd's BBC television series The Romantics, Sutton joined the cast of Albion Rising at St Giles in the Fields Church, London, in April 2007. He reprised the role in the film of the same name in 2009.

Sutton had a small role in the British teenage drama Skins as Freddie's granddad. He also appeared in the episode of Holby City broadcast on 15 March 2011 as a patient who fell down an escalator in a shopping centre. In 2012, he featured in the video "Once And For All" by Clock Opera.

Sutton also appeared in episode three of the BBC comedy series Family Tree ("The Austerity Games"), which was first broadcast in July 2013, and was a guest star in episode three of the BBC series Boomers in 2014. He played William Makepeace in Emmerdale in 2014.

In 2015 he appeared as a Roman Catholic rector in the BBC TV series Father Brown episode 3.6 "The Upcott Fraternity". He also appeared in two episodes of the BBC's day time show, Doctors, in August 2015. He narrated the 2016 documentary The Future of Work and Death. In November 2017 he played the lead role in a video for the Tom Chaplin song "Midnight Mass".

Personal life
He married American actress Marjorie Steele in 1961; she had previously been married to the millionaire producer Huntington Hartford. Sutton and Steele had one child together, but divorced in 1965. He had two more children.

Death 
Sutton died of cancer on 15 September 2018 at the age of 85.  He is survived by three children, Peter, Barnaby and Fanny.

Filmography 

 A Night to Remember (1958) – lookout (uncredited)
 Go to Blazes (1962) – boy lover
 The Boys (1962) – Stan Coulter
 The Leather Boys (1964) – Pete
 The Human Jungle (1964, TV Series) - Leigh Garner
 The Saint (1964, S3E4: "The Scorpion") – Eddy
 Rotten to the Core (1965) – Jelly
 Crossplot (1969) – Warren
 The Walking Stick (1970) – Ted Sandymount
 One More Time (1970) – Wilson
 A Town Called Bastard (1971) – Spectre
 The Devils (1971) – Baron De Laubardemont
 Family Life (1971) – Ambulance man (uncredited)
 Mr. Forbush and the Penguins (1971) – Starshot
 Madame Sin (1972) – Monk
 Diamonds on Wheels (1973, TV Movie) – Finch
 Paganini Strikes Again (1973) – Raddings
 The Stud (1974, by Wilbur Stark) – Randy Warpshot / Longstreet / Charlady / Yidnar Warpshot / Newsboy
 The Sweeney (1975) – Golden Boy / Max Deller
 Pure as a Lily (1976) – Jack
 Fellini's Casanova (1976) – Duke of Wuertemberg
 The Pink Panther Strikes Again (1976) – Hugh McClaren
 The Glitterball (1977) - (uncredited)
 The Prince and the Pauper (1977) – Hodge
 Valentino (1977) – Willie
 No. 1 of the Secret Service (1977) – K.R.A.S.H. Leader
 The Big Sleep (1978) – Lanny
 The Playbirds (1978) – Hern
 The London Connection (1979) – Goetz
 The Island (1980) – Dr. Brazil
 George and Mildred (1980) – Jacko
 Brimstone and Treacle (1982) – Stroller
 Widows (1983, TV Mini-Series) - Boxer Davis 
 Those Glory Glory Days (1983, TV Movie) – Arthur – Journalist
 Lamb (1985) – Haddock
 A State of Emergency (1986) – Soviet professor
 The Rainbow (1989) – MacAllister
 Edward II (1991) – Bishop of Winchester
 Orlando (1992) – King James I
 Incognito (1998) – Halifax / Offul
 The Tichborne Claimant (1998) – Onslow Onslow
 Up at the Villa (2000) – Harold Atkinson
 David Copperfield (2000, TV Movie) - Mr Dick
 This Filthy Earth (2001) – Papa
 Tomorrow La Scala! (2002) – Dennis
 Song for a Raggy Boy (2003) – Brother Tom
 The Football Factory (2004) – Bill Farrell
 Irish Jam (2006) – Pat Duffy
 Dean Spanley (2008) – Marriot
 Sezon tumanov (2009) – Darby
 Albion Rising (2009) – William Blake
 Skins (2010, TV Series) – Norman McClair
 The Shouting Men (2010) – Charlie
 Weekend Retreat (2011) – Paulie
 Billy the Kid (2011) – Billy
 Outside Bet (2011) – Alfie Hobnails
 Cockneys vs Zombies (2012) – Eric
 Katherine of Alexandria (2014) – Marcellus
 Tin (2015) – Zachariah Bennett
 When the Devil Rides Out (2017) – George
 Steven Berkoff's Tell Tale Heart (2019) – Old Man

References

External links 

1933 births
2018 deaths
Male actors from Surrey
English male film actors
English male soap opera actors
Alumni of RADA
Royal Air Force airmen
People from Kingston upon Thames